Leah Goldberg or Lea Goldberg (May 29, 1911, Königsberg – January 15, 1970, Jerusalem) was a prolific Hebrew-language poet, author, playwright, literary translator, and comparative literary researcher. 

Her writings are considered classics of Israeli literature.

Biography
Leah Goldberg was born to a Jewish Lithuanian family from Kaunas, however her mother traveled to the nearby German city of Königsberg (today, Russian Kaliningrad) in order to give birth in better medical conditions. When asked about her place of birth, Goldberg often stated "Kaunas" rather than Königsberg.

When the First World War broke out, three-year-old Goldberg had to escape with her parents to the Russian Empire, where they spent a year in hard conditions. In Russia, her mother gave birth to a baby boy, Immanuel, who died before reaching his first birthday.

According to Goldberg's autobiographical account, in 1938, when the family traveled back to Kaunas in 1919, a Lithuanian border patrol stopped them and accused her father of being a "Bolshevik spy". They locked the father in a nearby abandoned stable, and abused him by preparing his execution every morning for about a week and cancelling it at the last moment. When the border guards finally let the family go, Goldberg's father was in a serious mental state. He eventually lost his ability to function normally and left Kaunas and his family to receive treatment, though it is unclear what his fate was and why he never returned to his family. Goldberg and her mother became very close and lived together until Leah Goldberg's death.

Goldberg's parents spoke several languages, though Hebrew was not one of them. However, Goldberg learned Hebrew at a very young age, as she received her elementary education in a Jewish Hebrew-language school. She began keeping a diary in Hebrew when she was 10 years old. Her first diaries still show limited fluency in Hebrew and the influence of Russian language, but she was determined to write in Hebrew and mastered the language within a short period of time. Even though she was fluent and literate in various European languages, Goldberg wrote her published works, as well as her personal notes, only in Hebrew. In 1926, when she was 15 years old, she wrote in her personal diary, "The unfavourable condition of the Hebrew writer is no secret to me [...] Writing in a different language than Hebrew is the same to me as not writing at all. And yet I want to be a writer [...] This is my only objective."

Goldberg received a PhD from the Universities of Berlin and Bonn in Semitic languages and German. Her dissertation on the Samaritan Targum was supervised by Paul E. Kahle. Her erudition and renown was such that a leading newspaper in Palestine excitedly reported her plans to immigrate to that country. In 1935, she settled in Tel Aviv, where she joined a group of Zionist Hebrew poets of Eastern-European origin known as  Yachdav ( "together"). This group was led by Avraham Shlonsky and was characterised by adhering to Symbolism especially in its Russian Acmeist form, and rejecting the style of Hebrew poetry that was common among the older generation, particularly that of Haim Nachman Bialik.

She never married and lived with her mother, first in Tel Aviv and later in Jerusalem. Goldberg was a heavy smoker, and in her late years she became aware of the damage in this habit, as reflected in her poem "About the Damage of Smoking". In the spring of 1969, she was diagnosed with breast cancer. After removing one of her breasts, her physicians were optimistic. Goldberg went on a short visit to Switzerland, but returned in a bad physical condition, as the cancer spread through her body. She died on 15 January 1970. Goldberg received the Israel Prize posthumously, her mother took the prize in her name.

Literary career

Goldberg worked as a high-school teacher and earned a living writing rhymed advertisements until she was hired as an editor by the Hebrew newspapers Davar and Al HaMishmar. She also worked as a children’s book editor at Sifriyat Po'alim publishing house, while also writing theatre reviews and literary columns. In 1954 she became a literature lecturer at the Hebrew University of Jerusalem, advancing to senior lecturer in 1957 and full professor in 1963, when she was appointed head of the university's Department of Comparative Literature.  

Goldberg wrote Hebrew poetry, drama, and children's literature. Goldberg's books for children, among them "A Flat for Rent" ("דירה להשכיר", dira lehaskir) and "Miracles and Wonders" (ניסים ונפלאות, nisim veniflaot), have become classics of Hebrew-language children's literature.

With exemplary knowledge of seven languages, Goldberg also translated numerous foreign literary works exclusively into Modern Hebrew from Russian, Lithuanian, German, Italian, French, and English. Of particular note is her magnum opus of translation, Tolstoy's epic novel War and Peace, as well as translations of Rilke, Thomas Mann, Chekhov, Akhmatova, Shakespeare, and Petrarch, plus many other works including reference books and works for children.

Novel
In 1946, Goldberg published her first novel, והוא האור (Hebrew: Vehu ha'or, literally: "And he is the light"; also translated "it is the light", "this is the light"). The novel had a strong autobiographical basis, and has been received as shedding much light on the rest of her work. The book opens with symbolic patricide: the protagonist, Nora, is pressed by someone she meets to describe her parents. She does not want to disclose the fact her father is at a psychiatric hospital and tries to evade the questions, but the other person wouldn't let go, until Nora explodes: "I have no father! My father is dead!  Do you hear? Dead!".  Despite this attempt, the specter of mental illness continues to haunt her throughout the novel.

Literary style and influences
Goldberg was widely read in Russian, German, and French poetry.  Symbolism and Acmeism were strong influences on her style.  Her poetry is notable for coherence and clarity, and for an emphasis on ideas over baroque forms. Nili Gold, Modern Hebrew Literature scholar and editor of the English translation of And This is the Light, has noted Goldberg's "high aestheticism, musicality, and unique merging of intellect and humanity".

Goldberg's poetics perceive the general in the specific: a drop of dew represents vast distances and the concrete reflects the abstract. Her poetry has been described as "a system of echoes and mild reverberations, voices and whispers," that recognizes the limitations of the poem and language. Her work is minor and modest, taking a majestic landscape like the  Jerusalem hills and focusing on a stone, a thorn, one yellow butterfly, a single bird in the sky.

Unlike many of her contemporary peers, most notably Nathan Alterman, Goldberg avoided outright political poetry, and did not contribute occasional poetry to Hebrew periodicals with overt current-affairs discourse.

Acclaim and remembrance
Goldberg received in 1949 the Ruppin Prize (for the volume "Al Haprikhá")
and, in 1970, the Israel Prize for literature.

The American Hebraist, Gabriel Preil, wrote a poem about Goldberg: "Leah's Absence".

In 2011, Goldberg was announced as one of four great Israeli poets who would appear on Israel's currency (together with Rachel Bluwstein, Shaul Tchernichovsky, and Natan Alterman).

The design of the 100 new shekel banknote includes the portrait of Leah Goldberg and her poem In the land of my love the almond tree blossoms in microprint.

See also

Hebrew literature
Culture of Israel
List of Israel Prize recipients
List of Hebrew-language authors

References

Further reading
And This Is the Light, translated by Barbara Harshav (Toby Press, 2011).
With This Night, translated by Annie Kantar (University of Texas Press, 2011).
The Selected Poetry and Drama of Leah Goldberg, translated by Rachel Tzvia Back (Toby Press, 2005).
"From Songs of Two Autumns" (poem), translated by Annie Kantar.
Leah Goldberg in the Lexicon of the Hebrew new literature on net לקסיקון הספרות העברית החדשה
The Modern Hebrew Poem Itself (Wayne State University Press, 2003), 
"The Shortest Journey (poem) in New Translations (English)
 "On the Blossoming,' translated by Miriam Billig Sivan (Garland Pub., 1992).
"Re-reading It is the Light, Lea Goldberg's Only Novel," by Nili Gold (Prooftexts, Vol. 17, 1997).

External links

 A documentary film about Lea Goldberg
 Ivrim Interviews with Goldberg friends and researchers
 Google Doodle (Israel only) on Ms. Goldberg's 102nd birthday

1911 births
1970 deaths
People from Kaunas
Jewish poets
Israeli children's writers
Jewish Israeli writers
Jewish women writers
Israeli women poets
Israel Prize in literature recipients
Israel Prize women recipients
Israeli translators
Lithuanian Jews
Modernist poets
Modernist women writers
Sonneteers
Humboldt University of Berlin alumni
University of Bonn alumni
Academic staff of the Hebrew University of Jerusalem
Israeli women children's writers
20th-century Israeli women writers
20th-century translators
20th-century Israeli poets
Deaths from lung cancer in Israel
Lithuanian emigrants to Mandatory Palestine
Israeli people of Lithuanian-Jewish descent